Hector Cameron,  (June 3, 1832 – November 2, 1896) was a lawyer and political figure in Ontario, Canada. He represented Victoria North in the House of Commons of Canada from 1875 to 1887 as a Conservative member.

He was born in Montreal, the son of Kenneth Cameron and Christian Selby. Cameron was the nephew of John Cameron who had served in the assembly for the Province of Canada. He was educated at King's College London, Trinity College Dublin and the University of Toronto. Cameron was called to the bar in 1854. In 1860, he married Clara Boswell. In 1872, he was named Queen's Counsel. He practised law in Toronto. Cameron was an unsuccessful candidate for the House of Commons in 1867, 1872, 1874 and a subsequent by-election held in 1874. The election of James Maclennan in 1874 was overturned and Cameron was declared elected in 1875. He was elected again in 1878 and 1882 but defeated by John Augustus Barron when he ran for reelection in 1887. Cameron was a director of the Huron and Quebec Railway. He died in Cobourg at the age of 64.

References 

1832 births
1896 deaths
Alumni of King's College London
University of Toronto alumni
Members of the House of Commons of Canada from Ontario
Conservative Party of Canada (1867–1942) MPs
Canadian King's Counsel